There are over 9,000 Grade I listed buildings in England.  This page is a list of the 28 of these buildings in the county of Rutland.

Rutland

|}

Notes

References 
English Heritage Images of England

External links

 
Rutland
Lists of listed buildings in Rutland